Massucci is a surname of Italian origin. Notable people with the surname include:

 Francesco Massucci (1610–1656), Italian Roman Catholic prelate, Bishop of Penne e Atri

Italian-language surnames
Surnames of Italian origin